The  is a limited express train service in Kyushu, Japan, operated by Kyushu Railway Company (JR Kyushu) since June 2011.

Service pattern and station stops
Services normally operate on weekends, Public holidays, and additional days, such as school holidays, with two return workings (Aso Boy 101, 102, 103, 104) per day. The  journey between Kumamoto and Miyaji takes approximately 1 hour 30 minutes.

Services stop at the following stations.

 -  -  -  -  -  -  - 

Rolling stock
The train is formed of specially modified 4-car KiHa 183-1000 diesel multiple unit set converted from the former Yufu DX trainset.

Formation
The train is formed as follows, with car 1 at the Miyaji end, and car 4 at the Kumamoto end.

Interior
All cars are no-smoking.

History
The Aso Boy service was introduced on 4 June 2011.

See also
 Joyful Train

References

External links
 JR Kyushu Aso Boy train information 
 Aso Boy seating plan 

Named passenger trains of Japan
Railway services introduced in 2011
2011 establishments in Japan
Kyushu Railway Company

ja:九州横断特急